The Republic of Lakotah or Lakotah is a proposed independent republic in North America for the Lakota people. Proposed in 2007 by activist Russell Means, the suggested territory would be enclaved by the borders of the United States, covering thousands of square miles in North Dakota, South Dakota, Nebraska, Wyoming, and Montana.  The proposed borders are those of the 1851 Treaty of Fort Laramie between the United States government and the Lakota. These lands are now occupied by Indian reservations and non-Native settlements. None of the existing Lakota tribal governments support the proposed republic, and they were not consulted about the proposal.

Proposed boundaries
The proposed boundaries of Lakotah would be the Yellowstone River to the north, the North Platte River to the south, the Missouri River to the east and an irregular line marking the west. These borders coincide with those set by the 1851 Treaty of Fort Laramie:

Background

Motivations for independence

The group has stated several reasons for its assertion of sovereignty, all a result of what they refer to as the "colonial apartheid" of the reservation system in the United States. The group claims that control by the United States has led to massive unemployment, poverty, and disease among the Lakota people and alleges that 150 years of U.S. administration is responsible for the statistical poverty of Lakota lands. The group claims that withdrawal from the United States will reverse these problems, and help re-establish the Lakota language and culture. The group claims there have been persistent violations by the United States of their treaties with the Lakota.

Another longstanding point of contention between the Lakota and the United States is the status of the Black Hills of South Dakota, which were part of Sioux reservation lands until they were taken without compensation by the US government and opened for gold mining following the collapse of the Treaty of Fort Laramie (1868).  In 1980, the U.S. Supreme Court decision United States v. Sioux Nation of Indians awarded $105 million to eight tribes of Sioux Indians as compensation ($17.1 million for the market value of the land in 1877 and $88 million in 5% per annum simple interest between 1877 and 1980), but the court did not award land. The tribal governments of the Lakota have refused the settlement.

Lakotah's founders cite their motivation for founding the group can be found in the Oglala 1974 Declaration of Continuing Independence:

Politics and government
Citizenship in the proposed republic would be open to people of all races and to any resident of the land Lakotah claims. The group said they planned to issue their own passports and driver licenses in the name of the proposed nation.  The group proposed that the nation be organized as a confederation that would respect the libertarian principles of posse comitatus and caveat emptor; would offer "individual liberty through community rule;" and would collect no nationwide taxes. Individual communities within the proposed nation, however, would be allowed to levy taxes with the consent of the taxed.  Means suggested that the proposed nation should not use fiat currency but instead adopt a gold standard.  Means stated that this system of government is derived from the traditional Lakota government system, saying, "we are going to implement how we lived prior to the Invasion. Each community will be a mini-state unto itself ... They will form the federation known as Lakotah."    Leaders of communities would be informally chosen by elders of the community.

Proposed governmental structure
Four activists, calling themselves the Lakota Freedom Delegation, traveled to Washington, D.C., on December 17, 2007, and delivered a statement declaring that they were, "withdrawing from the treaties their ancestors signed with the U.S." and "setting up their own independent nation." Reasons cited included that "the federal government has failed to abide by 33 treaties that promised land, health care, education and other services." Their leader was Russell Means, one of the prominent members of the American Indian Movement in the late 1960s and 1970s.

The Lakota Freedom Delegation stated that they did not recognize tribal governments or presidents as recognized by the United States Bureau of Indian Affairs, sometimes referring to these groups as "stay-by-the-fort Indians". Nor did any tribal governments, elected by the tribal people themselves, recognize the Republic of Lakotah.

The Republic of Lakotah announced its provisional capital is Porcupine, South Dakota with hopes in the long run to move the administration to near Rapid City, South Dakota.

Before his death, in 2012, Means identified himself as "chief facilitator" of a provisional government of the Republic of Lakotah.  The four signatories of the Lakota Freedom Delegation's letter to the U.S. government that announced the region's withdrawal from the U.S. identified themselves by the title of "Itacan of Lakota" in a press release.

Means stated that he intended to treat the result of the 2008 Pine Ridge Reservation presidential election, in which he was a candidate, as a "plebiscite/referendum" on Lakota independence. He lost that election 1,918 to 2,277.

Assertion of independence
These four identified themselves as members of the provisional government of Lakotah, these being: 1) Russell Means, chief facilitator (died 2012); 2) Tegheya Kte, (also known as Garry Rowland), facilitator; 3) Duane "Canupa Gluha Mani" Martin, provisional government member; and 4) Phyllis Young, provisional government member.  This "Freedom Delegation" traveled to Washington, D.C. and contacted the State Department, announcing in a letter dated December 17, 2007, that the Lakota were unilaterally withdrawing from its several treaties with the United States government.  The document further declared the Lakota to be "predecessor sovereign of Dakota Territory", and cited gross violations of the treaties between the Lakota and the United States as the immediate cause for withdrawal. The letter invited the United States government to enter into negotiations with the newly declared "Lakotah".  It threatened that if good-faith negotiations were not begun, then "Lakotah" will begin to administer liens against real estate transactions within the five state area of Lakotah."

Legal basis for independence

Supporters of Lakotah argue that their assertion of sovereignty is entirely legal under "natural, international and United States law". The group emphasizes that the Republic's establishment comes from a withdrawal from the United States, not a secession.  They claim the right to withdraw, on behalf of the Lakota people, from the Treaties of Fort Laramie as a consequence of the Vienna Convention on the Law of Treaties and the Declaration on the Rights of Indigenous Peoples.  Members argue that the decision in the case of Lone Wolf v. Hitchcock, 187 U.S. 553 (1903) shows that the United States Government does not adequately protect Indian rights.  Means cited the Enabling Act of 1889, that contained clauses protecting Indian sovereignty on the lands comprising the states where the Lakota historically reside and have been ignored.

In a 15 January 2008 news release, the Republic of Lakotah proposed that independence from the United States might follow a Compact of Free Association, and suggested that the independence process could resemble that of the Philippines, Palau, the Federated States of Micronesia, or the Marshall Islands.

International contacts
The group has pursued international recognition for Lakotah at several embassies, including those of Venezuela, Bolivia, Chile, and South Africa.

Reactions
Means and Mani have claimed that some 13,000 Lakota, 77% of the population of Pine Ridge Indian Reservation, have shown support for the Republic of Lakotah, and that the eight-member delegation which traveled to Washington, D.C. was only a portion of some 77 tribal elders and activists taking part in the movement.

Federal government
The United States Department of State referred queries on the subject of Lakotah to the United States Department of the Interior, which oversees the Bureau of Indian Affairs.  Gary Garrison of the BIA said that the group's withdrawal "doesn't mean anything."  He went on to say, "These are not legitimate tribal governments elected by the people ... when they begin the process of violating other people's rights, breaking the law, they're going to end up like all the other groups that have declared themselves independent — usually getting arrested and being put in jail."

Regarding the government response, or lack thereof, Russell Means stated that, "I don't expect the federal government to do anything. I don't believe they even know what to do."

Lakota tribes
None of the existing Lakota tribal governments supported the proposed republic, and they were not consulted about the proposal.  Rapid City Journal reporter Bill Harlan reported on his blog that "...most folks I talk to hadn't heard about the declaration. The ones who had heard the news, to a person, did not want to talk about it on the record."  The Journal noted that "...there were no tribal presidents in the group which made the announcement, no one from the top ranks of any of the Lakota Sioux tribes..."  Nanwica Kciji, an Oglala Lakota and first president of the Native American Journalists Association, has discredited the December 2007 developments, arguing that the Lakotah Freedom Delegation "never considered that treaties are made between nations and not individuals."  According to scholar Hiroshi Fukurai, "...the declaration of independence by the Republic of Lakotah in 2007 has been largely ignored by the US, as well as by the UN and its Member States."

Other tribal governments and groups
Rodney Bordeaux, chairman of the Rosebud Sioux, said that Rosebud Indian Reservation has no interest in joining the Republic of Lakotah and said that the Lakota Freedom Delegation never presented their plan to the tribal council.  Bordeaux stated that the group does not represent the Lakota people nor the support of the elected tribal governments. He did say, however, that Means "...made some good points".

Joseph Brings Plenty, chairman of the Cheyenne River Lakota, agreed that the Lakota Freedom Delegation "are not representative of the nation I represent" but would not say whether he agreed or disagreed with their goals and message, noting some value in the group's actions in raising awareness for the history of the Lakota people.

The Alaskan Independence Party, in an announcement dated December 21, 2007, "applauded" the independent Lakota nation and granted it "full recognition". The secessionist movement Second Vermont Republic has also announced its support, and encouraged other American Indian groups to similarly declare independence from the United States.

International responses
In February 2008, the Lakotah Freedom Delegation handed over a formal petition, asking for recognition of the Republic of Lakotah, to the embassies of Russia, Serbia, Bolivia, Venezuela, the Republic of South Africa, Ireland, France, Nicaragua, East Timor, Chile, Turkey, India, Finland, Iceland and Uruguay. The text of the petition is available online.  According to Means, Venezuela's ambassador to the United States stated to the group that his country would not recognize Lakotah's independence based on Venezuela's interpretation of what the Lakotah Freedom Delegation is doing.

Lakotah activities
On January 1, 2008, the republic announced that it would file liens on all U.S. government-held lands within their claimed borders; however, the first round of liens, in an unnamed county in South Dakota, were rejected.  In July 2008, Means announced that the Republic of Lakotah would be creating an all-Lakota "grand jury" to investigate corruption by U.S. government officials on the seven reservations in the republic's claimed territory.

Means unsuccessfully ran for the presidency of the Oglala Lakota several times; in the 2008 election he lost 1,918 to 2,277.

See also
 Great Sioux Reservation
 Great Sioux Nation
 Land Back
 Siouxland
 State of Sequoyah

References

External links

 Republic of Lakotah
 
 "Ways and Means" By Bill Donahue, Washington Post

Lakotah
Lakota
Native American nationalism
Proposed countries
Separatism in the United States